This is a list of the main career statistics of Swiss professional tennis player, Stan Wawrinka. To date, Wawrinka has won sixteen ATP singles titles, including three Grand Slam singles titles at the 2014 Australian Open, the 2015 French Open, and the 2016 US Open, and one ATP Masters 1000 title at the 2014 Monte-Carlo Rolex Masters. He was also a semifinalist at the 2013 US Open, the 2015 Australian Open, the 2015 US Open, and the 2013, 2014 and 2015 ATP World Tour Finals. He also has reached the quarterfinals at 2014 and 2015 Wimbledon. Wawrinka also won a gold medal partnering Roger Federer in men's doubles for Switzerland in the 2008 Summer Olympics in Beijing, beating Swedish team Simon Aspelin and Thomas Johansson. In 2014 Wawrinka was part of the Swiss National Team, winning the Davis Cup for the first time.

His best singles ranking to date is World No. 3, achieved for the first time on 27 January 2014.

Performance timelines

Singles
Current through the 2023 Indian Wells Masters.

Significant finals

Grand Slam finals

Singles: 4 (3 titles, 1 runner-up)

Olympics finals

Doubles: 1 (1 gold medal)

Masters 1000 finals

Singles: 4 (1 title, 3 runner-ups)

Doubles: 1 (1 runner-up)

ATP career finals

Singles: 30 (16 titles, 14 runner-ups)

Doubles: 6 (2 titles, 4 runner–ups)

Team competition: 1 (1 title)

Records accomplished in the Open Era (Post 1968)

Best Grand Slam results details

Record against other players

Record against top 10 players
Wawrinka's match record against those who have been ranked in the top 10, with those who have been No. 1 in boldface

  Marin Čilić 12–2
  Tomáš Berdych 11–5
  Andy Murray 9–13
  Grigor Dimitrov 7–4
  Kei Nishikori 7–4
  David Ferrer 7–7
  Marcos Baghdatis 6–0
  David Nalbandian 6–3
  Nicolás Almagro 6–3
  Novak Djokovic 6–20
  Fabio Fognini 5–1
  Milos Raonic 5–3
  Gilles Simon 5–3
  Jo-Wilfried Tsonga 5–3
  Kevin Anderson 5–4
  Juan Monaco 4–1
  James Blake 3–0
  Pablo Carreno Busta 3–0
  Andy Roddick 3–1
  Marat Safin 3–1
  Dominic Thiem 3–1
  David Goffin 3–2
  Juan Carlos Ferrero 3–3
  Richard Gasquet 3–3
  Ivan Ljubičić 3–3
  Gael Monfils 3–3
  Fernando Verdasco 3–3
  Mikhail Youzhny 3–3
  Juan Martín del Potro 3–4
  Radek Štěpánek 3–4
  Tommy Robredo 3–6
  Rafael Nadal 3–19
  Roger Federer 3–23
  Guillermo Canas 2–0
  Taylor Fritz 2–0
  Sébastien Grosjean 2–0
  Ernests Gulbis 2–0
  Nicolas Massu 2–1
  Lleyton Hewitt 2–2
  Karen Khachanov 2–2
  Nicolas Kiefer 2–2
  Daniil Medvedev 2–2
  Jürgen Melzer 2–2
  Robin Söderling 2–2
  John Isner 2–3
  Jannik Sinner 2–3
  Roberto Bautista Agut 1–0
  Tim Henman 1–0
  Lucas Pouille 1–0
  Jack Sock 1–0
  Janko Tipsarević 1–0
  Stefanos Tsitsipas 1–0
  Nicolas Lapentti 1–1
  Mariano Puerta 1–1
  Holger Rune 1–1
  Paradorn Srichaphan 1–1
  Mario Ančić 1–2
  Nikolay Davydenko 1–2
   Greg Rusedski 1–2
  Félix Mantilla 0–1
  Carlos Moyá 0–1
  Gastón Gaudio 0–1
  Tommy Haas 0–2
  Mardy Fish 0–3
  Alexander Zverev 0–3
  Fernando González 0–5

* Statistics correct as of February 2023.

Top 10 wins
He has a  record against players who were, at the time the match was played, ranked in the top 10.

Career Grand Slam tournament seedings
The tournaments won by Wawrinka are in boldface.

Davis Cup (26 wins, 25 losses)

   indicates the result of the Davis Cup match followed by the score, date, place of event, the zonal classification and its phase, and the court surface.

Notes

References

External links

 
 
 

Statistics
Wawrinka, Stanislas
Sport in Switzerland